The Holland 602 type submarine, also known as the H-class submarine, was one of the most numerous submarines of World War I. The type was designed by the Electric Boat Co. of the United States, but most of the boats were built abroad: in Canada by the subsidiary of the British Vickers company and in British shipyards. 

Operators included the United States Navy, the Chilean Navy, the Royal Navy (33 submarines), the Imperial Russian Navy, the Soviet Navy, the Italian Regia Marina, the Royal Canadian Navy, the Royal Dutch Navy and the navy of the short-lived Ukrainian State.

Background and history
The predecessor for this class were two submarines ordered in 1911 for the Chilean Navy, to the John Philip Holland design 19-E and design 19-B.  These eventually became the s of the Royal Canadian Navy.

Origin of project's number is in Electric Boat company rule, according to which, project variant for export purposes was named with replaced digits and with adding 0 between them. Thus, project EB 26 became the project EB 602.
 
Three prototypes were then built to an improved design 30, with an increased displacement of 358/434 tons.

In October 1914, after the start of World War I, the British Admiralty ordered ten submarines to design 602E, to be built by Canadian Vickers in Montreal, Quebec. These would become the British H-class submarines. Another ten submarines were secretly constructed at Fore River Yard at Quincy, Massachusetts, in the then neutral United States. This group was impounded by the United States government and ended up in the Chilean Navy and the Royal Canadian Navy after the American declaration of war. A third group, of twenty-five British H-class subs, was constructed in 1917-1919 in Britain, many of them serving in World War II.

In the summer of 1915 eight type 602 submarines were ordered by the Italian Regia Marina. These were built in Montreal, Quebec.

In 1917 the Imperial Russian Navy ordered a total of 17 submarines for its Baltic and Black Sea Fleets. These were built at a temporary shipyard in Barnet on Burrard Inlet outside Vancouver, British Columbia. They were then disassembled, taken by ship to Vladivostok, by the Trans-Siberian Railroad to Saint Petersburg and Nikolayev to be reassembled in Russian shipyards. In Russia they were known as the Amerikansky Golland-class submarines. 

Six of the boats were undelivered at the time of the Russian Revolution of 1917. These were later bought by the United States Navy, and after reassembly at the Puget Sound Navy Yard, they became the United States H-class submarines H-4 - H-9. 
In 1918 the Black Sea Fleet submarines АG-21-АG-26 were taken over by the Ukrainian State Navy.
In May 1918 the Finnish Navy salvaged two of the Baltic Fleet submarines scuttled off Hanko at the end of the Finnish Civil War, but was unable to refit them for service.

Submarines

Royal Navy 

H class (42 in total)
 Group 1 (1915)
  -  (10 boats)
 Group 2 (1915–1918, The whole group was impounded by the US government.)
 ,  (2 boats) delivered after US declaration of war.
 ,  -  (6 boats) were transferred to Chile
 ,  (2 boats) were transferred to Canada
 Group 3 (1917–1919)
  -  (25 boats; H53, H54 cancelled)

United States Navy 
 United States H-class submarines
 USS H-1 - H-3 (3 boats, prototypes)
 USS H-4 - H-9 (6 boats, originally built for the Imperial Russian Navy)

Italian Regia Marina 
 Italian H1 - H8 (8 boats)

Imperial Russian Navy 
 American Holland-class submarine
 Group 1 Baltic Fleet
 AG-11 - AG-16 (5 boats, AG-13 was renamed to AG-16)
 Group 2
 AG-17 - AG-20, AG-27 - AG-28 (6 boats) retained by US and served as USS H-4 - H-9.
 Group 3 Black Sea Fleet
 AG-21 - AG-26 (6 boats)

Royal Canadian Navy 

Chilean Navy 
 H1 - H6 (6 boats) originally built for the Royal Navy

See also
 List of submarines of the Second World War

Notes

References 

 The Legend of Electric Boat, by Jeffrey L. Rodengen, 1994 
 Britain's Clandestine Submarines 1914-1915, by Gaddis Smith, 1964, . 
 The Subterfuge Submarines, by E. C. Fischer jr., in Warship International , 1977 Vol. XIV No.3
 Building Submarines for Russia in Burrard Inlet, by W.Kaye Lamb, in BC Studies'' No.71 Autumn, 1986

External links

 World War One Submarines Built in Canada
 The Canadian-built British H-boats
 Technical Details
 Photo gallery
 City of Los Angeles . . . An Inland City with the First Submarine Base on the Pacific Coast
 uboat.net

Submarine classes